Whitescarver Hall is a historic dormitory building located on the campus of Alderson Broaddus University at Philippi, Barbour County, West Virginia, United States. It was built in 1911–1912, and is a three-story white brick building in the Neoclassical style. It measures 40 feet by 90 feet. It features a hipped roof covered in red tile and four classical pilaster topped with Ionic order capitals.

It was listed on the National Register of Historic Places in 1990.

See also
 National Register of Historic Places listings at colleges and universities in the United States

References

External links

Residential buildings completed in 1912
Buildings and structures in Barbour County, West Virginia
Neoclassical architecture in West Virginia
National Register of Historic Places in Barbour County, West Virginia
Residential buildings on the National Register of Historic Places in West Virginia
Alderson Broaddus University
Historic American Buildings Survey in West Virginia
University and college buildings on the National Register of Historic Places in West Virginia
1912 establishments in West Virginia